Emile Hendrix (born 5 December 1955) is a Dutch equestrian. He competed in two events at the 1996 Summer Olympics.

References

External links
 

1955 births
Living people
Dutch male equestrians
Olympic equestrians of the Netherlands
Equestrians at the 1996 Summer Olympics
Sportspeople from Limburg (Netherlands)
20th-century Dutch people